Santiago Ramírez Debali (born 12 March 1998) is an Uruguayan footballer who currently plays for Central Español as a forward.

References

Uruguayan footballers
1998 births
People from Paysandú Department
Danubio F.C. players
Deportivo Maldonado players
Central Español players
Uruguayan Primera División players
Association football defenders
Living people